Aleksandr "Alex" Valeryevich Averbukh (born October 1, 1974) is a retired Russian decathlete and Israeli Olympic athlete, who competed in the pole vault.

He won silver and bronze medals at the World Championships, won a gold medal as the European champion in both 2002 and 2006, and won a gold medal at the 2013 Maccabiah Games. His personal best is 5.93 metres.

Biography
He was born in the Russian SSR, USSR, and is Jewish.  He was formerly a decathlete competing for Russia, but he later became an Israeli citizen and rose to top level in pole vault. He competed in the 2001 Maccabiah Games, winning a gold medal.

He won silver and bronze medals at the World Championships and won a gold medal twice as the European champion in 2002 and 2006. His personal best is 5.93 metres, achieved in 2003 in Madrid. He retired from competition in 2009.

He competed on behalf of Israel at the 2008 Summer Olympics in Beijing, China.

He competed in the pole vault at the 2009 Maccabiah Games.

In 2013 he briefly returned from retirement to compete in the 2013 Maccabiah Games, where he won a gold medal for first place.

One of his daughters is the model Anastasya Averbukh.

Achievements

See also
List of eligibility transfers in athletics
List of Jewish track and field athletes
List of Israeli records in athletics
List of Maccabiah records in athletics

References

External links

 
 

1974 births
Living people
Sportspeople from Irkutsk
Israeli male pole vaulters
Russian male pole vaulters
Russian decathletes
Olympic male pole vaulters
Olympic athletes of Israel
Athletes (track and field) at the 2000 Summer Olympics
Athletes (track and field) at the 2004 Summer Olympics
Athletes (track and field) at the 2008 Summer Olympics
Maccabiah Games gold medalists for Israel
Maccabiah Games medalists in athletics
Competitors at the 2001 Maccabiah Games
Competitors at the 2013 Maccabiah Games
Competitors at the 2009 Maccabiah Games
Universiade gold medalists in athletics (track and field)
Universiade gold medalists for Israel
Medalists at the 2001 Summer Universiade
Goodwill Games medalists in athletics
Competitors at the 2001 Goodwill Games
World Athletics Championships athletes for Israel
World Athletics Championships medalists
European Athletics Championships winners
European Athletics Championships medalists
European Athletics Indoor Championships winners
Russian Athletics Championships winners
Russian Jews
Soviet Jews
Jewish male athletes (track and field)
Russian emigrants to Israel